Michael Scott Horton (born May 11, 1964) has been the J. Gresham Machen Professor of Theology and Apologetics at Westminster Seminary California since 1998, Editor-in-Chief of Modern Reformation (MR) magazine, and President and host of the nationally syndicated radio broadcast, The White Horse Inn. Both Modern Reformation magazine and The White Horse Inn radio broadcast are now entities under the umbrella of White Horse Media, whose offices are located on the campus of Westminster Seminary California.

History
Horton was raised in an Arminian Baptist church. While in high school, Horton adopted Calvinistic beliefs as he read through the Bible, specifically the book of Romans. Horton claims he "threw his Bible across the room," as he read through Romans 9 and began to wrestle through the doctrines of election/predestination and the sovereignty of God. He began attending the Philadelphia Conference on Reformed Theology, where he met James Montgomery Boice, R.C. Sproul, and J.I. Packer.

Horton received a BA degree at Biola University. Since high school, he had always known that he wanted to go to Westminster Theological Seminary in Philadelphia. At the time, Westminster Seminary California was just starting in a small storefront in Escondido but many of the men Horton was reading at the time taught there, and this eventually led to his choice to get his MA there.  He learned Biblical Hebrew and Koine Greek, and studied under Meredith Kline. He was impressed by the important concepts put forward by Kline, Robert Strimple, Robert Godfrey, and Dennis Johnson.

Horton received his PhD from Wycliffe Hall, Oxford through Coventry University and completed a research fellowship at Yale Divinity School.

He was ordained a deacon in the Reformed Episcopal Church. He was the president of Christians United for Reformation (CURE), which later merged to become the Alliance of Confessing Evangelicals (ACE).  From 2001 to 2004 Horton served as the president of ACE, but is now no longer affiliated with that organization. He is also an ordained minister in the United Reformed Churches in North America (URCNA), has served at two churches in Southern California, and was the Associate Pastor at Christ United Reformed Church in Santee, California, a URCNA member church.  Horton taught an adult Sunday school class on God, suffering, sanctification, Calvinist theology, and the basics of the Heidelberg Catechism. This class is available on audio at the church website. He is now a member of the Escondido United Reformed Church.

In 1996 Christianity Today included him on their list of "Up & Comers: Fifty evangelical leaders 40 and under."

Personal
Horton lives in Escondido, California, with his wife Lisa and four children.

List of works
Horton has written and edited more than fifteen books, including:

 The Agony of Deceit:  What Some TV Preachers Are Really Teaching (1990)
 Putting Amazing Back Into Grace (2011)
 Beyond Culture Wars:  Is America A Mission Field or Battlefield? (1994)
 Where In The World Is The Church:  Understanding Culture & Your Role In It (1995)
 Power Religion: The Selling Out of The Evangelical Church, edited with Charles Colson (1997)
 Made In America:  The Shaping of Modern American Evangelicalism (1991)
 We Believe: Recovering the Essentials of the Apostle's Creed (1998)
 Covenant and Eschatology (2002)
 A Better Way: Rediscovering the Drama of God-Centered Worship (2003)
 The Law of Perfect Freedom (2004)
 Lord and Servant: A Covenant Christology (2005)
 Covenant & Salvation: Union with Christ (2007)
 Christless Christianity: The Alternative Gospel of the American Church (2012)
 People and Place: A Covenant Ecclesiology (2008; 2009 Christianity Today Book Award in Theology/Ethics)
 Too Good to be True:  Finding Hope in a World of Hype (2009)
 God of Promise: Introducing Covenant Theology (2009)
 The Gospel-Driven Life: Being Good News People in a Bad News World (2009)
 The Christian Faith: A Systematic Theology for Pilgrims on the Way (2011)
  Pilgrim Theology: Core Doctrine for Christian Disciples (2011)
 For Calvinism, with Maurice England (2011)
 The Gospel Commission (2012)
 .
 Rediscovering the Holy Spirit: God's Perfecting Presence in Creation, Redemption, and Everyday Life (2017)
 .

See also

 Cambridge Declaration

References

External links 

 Westminster Seminary California - Faculty Page
 The White Horse Inn, Dr. Horton's radio program
 Modern Reformation Magazine
 Adult Catechism, Christ United Reformed Church's teachings on Catechism, including some by Dr. Horton
 theopedia's entry on Michael S. Horton
 Joel Osteen Answers his Critics (60 Minutes story. Horton's appearance: from timestamp 7:20 until 8:35) 
 Christian talk show promotion of his Agony of Deceit book 

Alumni of Wycliffe Hall, Oxford
Alumni of Coventry University
Living people
Editors of Christian publications
1964 births
American Calvinist and Reformed theologians
20th-century Calvinist and Reformed theologians
21st-century Calvinist and Reformed theologians
Westminster Seminary California faculty
Biola University alumni
Critics of atheism